Neonitocris nigripes is a species of beetle in the family Cerambycidae. It was described by Hermann Julius Kolbe in 1893.

References

nigripes
Beetles described in 1893
Taxa named by Hermann Julius Kolbe